Louis D'ajon King (born April 6, 1999) is an American professional basketball player for the Philadelphia 76ers of the National Basketball Association (NBA), on a two-way contract with the Delaware Blue Coats of the NBA G League. He played college basketball for the Oregon Ducks.

High school career

Born in Secaucus, New Jersey as one of eight children, King attended Roselle Catholic High School for his freshman year and Pope John XXIII Regional High School as a sophomore, before transferring to Hudson Catholic Regional High School in Jersey City, New Jersey mid-year, where he had to sit out for the remainder of the season. At Hudson Catholic, he was teammates with Jahvon Quinerly. Prior to the 2017–18 season, he was named to the Naismith Prep Player of the Year Award watch list. During his senior year, he suffered a knee injury after landing awkwardly after a dunk. Despite  a shortened season, King averaged 15.2 points and 4.4 rebounds. He was named to the 2018 McDonald's All-American team and invited to the 2018 Nike Hoop Summit but was not able to participate due to the injury.

Recruiting
King was ranked among the top 25 prospects of the 2018 recruiting class by Rivals, 247Sports, and ESPN. He was also ranked as one of the top prospects in his state and at his position by all three scouting services.

College career
On September 21, 2017, King verbally committed to playing college basketball at Oregon. He picked Oregon over Kansas, Seton Hall, Purdue, and NC State. He averaged 13.5 points and 5.5 rebounds per game and was named to the Pac-12 All-Freshman team. His play was hampered however by hand and ankle injuries. Following the season he declared for the 2019 NBA draft.

Professional career

Detroit Pistons (2019–2020)
After going undrafted in the 2019 NBA draft, King signed a two-way contract with the Detroit Pistons. On December 2, 2020, King signed a second two-way contract, but was waived on December 14.

Westchester Knicks (2021)
On December 17, 2020, King was signed by the New York Knicks, and was then waived.

On January 21, 2021, King signed as an affiliate player with the Westchester Knicks for the NBA G League season, making his debut on February 10. In 15 games, he averaged 13.7 points, 4.9 rebounds, 3.0 assists and 1.5 steals in 32.2 minutes while shooting .456 from three, which ranked sixth overall in the league.

Sacramento Kings (2021–2022)
On May 1, 2021, King signed a two-way contract with the Sacramento Kings. On February 17, 2022, he was waived by the Kings.

Return to Westchester (2022)
On February 25, 2022, King was reacquired by the Westchester Knicks.

King joined the Phoenix Suns for the 2022 NBA Summer League.

Rio Grande Valley Vipers (2022)
On November 3, 2022, King was named to the opening night roster for the Rio Grande Valley Vipers.

Philadelphia 76ers (2022–present)
On December 26, 2022, King signed a two-way contract with the Philadelphia 76ers, splitting time with their NBA G League affiliate, the Delaware Blue Coats.

National team career
King represented the United States at the 2017 FIBA U19 World Cup in Cairo, Egypt. He averaged 6.1 points, 4.4 rebounds, and 2.1 assists during the tournament, helping the team win the bronze medal.

Career statistics

NBA

|-
| style="text-align:left;"| 
| style="text-align:left;"| Detroit
| 10 || 0 || 6.2 || .381 || .364 || .000 || 1.0 || .5 || .2 || .0 || 2.0
|-
| style="text-align:left;"| 
| style="text-align:left;"| Sacramento
| 6 || 1 || 14.2 || .500 || .364 || 1.000 || 3.4 || 1.5 || 1.2 || .5 || 7.3
|-
| style="text-align:left;"| 
| style="text-align:left;"| Sacramento
| 10 || 0 || 10.4 || .319 || .296 || .700 || 1.2 || .9 || .2 || .1 || 4.5
|-
| style="text-align:center;" colspan="2"| Career
| 26 || 1 || 9.7 || .392 || .327 || .684 || 1.5 || .9 || .4 || .2 || 4.2

College

|-
| style="text-align:left;"| 2018–19
| style="text-align:left;"| Oregon
| 31 || 28 || 30.4 || .435 || .386 || .785 || 5.5 || 1.3 || .9 || .2 || 13.5

Personal life
Louis' parents are Louis and Ativea King. He went to Northern Burlington Middle School in Columbus, New Jersey for both years where he dominated the school basketball team.

References

External links
Oregon Ducks bio

1999 births
Living people
American men's basketball players
Basketball players from Jersey City, New Jersey
Delaware Blue Coats players
Detroit Pistons players
Grand Rapids Drive players
McDonald's High School All-Americans
Oregon Ducks men's basketball players
People from Secaucus, New Jersey
Pope John XXIII Regional High School alumni
Rio Grande Valley Vipers players
Roselle Catholic High School alumni
Sacramento Kings players
Small forwards
Stockton Kings players
Undrafted National Basketball Association players
Westchester Knicks players